On October 13, 2004, American Army reservists participating in the Iraq War refused an order to drive a convoy of fuel tankers lacking armour plates through Baghdad, leading to claims of "mutiny" amongst the soldiers who claimed to be balking at a "suicide mission" that would have seen them enter hostile territory without a combat escort, in damaged trucks without armor plating.

The 343rd Quartermaster Company, based in Rock Hill, South Carolina had earlier been forced to turn back from an abortive 3.5 day journey to another army base which had refused their load of contaminated fuel.

Returning to Tallil Air Base, the same company was ordered to take their cargo to Taji, north of Baghdad. The journey would be through dangerous terrain known for ambushes by Iraqi insurgents and would be made without the usual infantry and helicopter escort.

Fallout
While 19 soldiers refused the order, only 18 were placed under investigation. In the end, the army decided not to pursue a court-martial against the soldiers, but rather to seek non-judicial punishments against five of them. Five soldiers were reassigned to different units.

The Army ordered the 120-troop company put on stand down, and taken off active duty while their vehicles were repaired and upgraded with steel armor plates. They returned to active status on November 11.

On October 21, the Army announced that they had replaced the commander of the unit at her own request. The first sergeant was also replaced as a result of the action.

References

Iraq War legal issues
Refusal of orders
United States Army in the Iraq War